The Indian Open is a professional ranking snooker tournament. Matthew Selt is the reigning champion.

History 
The event was introduced in the 2013/2014 season and it is the first ever ranking event to be held in India. The inaugural event was held between 14 and 18 October 2013 at the Le Meridian Hotel in New Delhi. The Billiards and Snooker Federation of India has signed a three-year contract for the tournament. In August 2014, it was announced that the event will be held at the Grand Hyatt in Mumbai. In September 2014, it was announced that the event has been postponed due to the State Election in Maharashtra, with the original dates of 13–17 October 2014 changed to 10–14 March 2015. The qualifying round held at the Barnsley Metrodome in Barnsley was due to take place from 18 to 21 September 2014 and has been moved to 12–13 February 2015.

Although the event was absent from the 2015/16 season it returned for the 2016/17 season, and was held in Hyderabad. For the 2017/18 season the tournament was held in Vishakhapatnam.

Winners

Statistics 
Highest ranked champion: John Higgins (2017) – #2
Lowest ranked champion: Matthew Selt (2019) – #41
Highest break: 147
 Zhou Yuelong (2019)

References

 
2013 establishments in India
Recurring sporting events established in 2013
Snooker ranking tournaments
Snooker competitions in India